Vulture Glacier may refer to:

Vulture Glacier (Alberta, Canada) a glacier in Banff National Park, Canada
Vulture Glacier (Montana) a glacier in Glacier National Park, USA
Vulture Glacier (Azeroth) a glacier in the dwarven kingdoms of the realm of Azeroth